The Tucson mayoral election of 2007 occurred on November 6, 2007, to elect the mayor of Tucson, Arizona, USA, and coincided with the elections to the Tucson City Council wards 1, 2 and 4. The incumbent Mayor, Bob Walkup, was re-elected.

Nominations
Primaries were held for the Democratic Green, and Republican parties on September 11, 2007.

Democratic primary
For the Democratic Party, Michael Toney, a write-in candidate won 1,147 votes, or 22.96% of the vote. This was insufficient to capture the nomination. The party did not ultimately have a candidate in the general election.

Green primary

Republican primary

General election
As there was no Democratic nominee, Walkup's main challenger was the Green Party nominee Dave Croteau, who he had also previously faced in the 1999 mayoral election when Croteau ran as a write-in candidate.

References

Mayoral elections in Tucson, Arizona
Tucson
Tucson